Ismatilla Raimovich Ergashev (Исматилла Раимович Эргашев) is the ambassador of Uzbekistan to Azerbaijan.
On 16 April 1999 he was accredited as Uzbek Ambassador to China.

See also
Azerbaijan-Uzbekistan relations

References

Living people
Ambassadors of Uzbekistan to Azerbaijan
Year of birth missing (living people)